National Tertiary Route 903, or just Route 903 (or ) is a National Road Route of Costa Rica, located in the Guanacaste province.

Description
In Guanacaste province the route covers Nandayure canton (Carmona, Porvenir, Bejuco districts).

References

Highways in Costa Rica